Football Club Aeti Sokhumi is a Georgian football club based in Tbilisi. They play in the Pirveli Liga.

Current squad

References

Football clubs in Georgia (country)
2011 establishments in Georgia (country)